Bærums Skiklub is a Norwegian multi sports club founded in 1885. It has sections for cross-country skiing, alpine skiing, freestyle skiing, snowboarding, biathlon and orienteering.

Notable club members

Notable club members include Nordic skiers Karl Hovelsen, Harald Økern, Olav Økern and Anne Jahren, alpine skiers Borghild Niskin, Inger Bjørnbakken, Toril Førland, Arild Holm, Finn Christian Jagge, Lasse Kjus and Hans Petter Buraas, Aleksander Aamodt Kilde, Lucas Braathen, Atle Lie McGrath and orienteering competitor Marit Økern Jensen.

Snowboarders and freestyle skiers include Christel Thoresen, Ståle Sandbech, Mons Røisland, Birk Ruud, Felix Stridsberg-Usterud, and Aleksander Østreng.

Biathletes such as Sturla Holm Lægreid, also originate from BSK.

References

Sports clubs established in 1885
Skiing in Norway
Ski jumping clubs in Norway
Orienteering clubs in Norway
1885 establishments in Norway